Adem Bona (born Ikechukwu Stanley Okoro; March 28, 2003) is a Turkish college basketball player for the UCLA Bruins of the Pac-12 Conference. Named a McDonald's All-American in high school, he was named to the Pac-12 All-Defensive Team and voted the Pac-12 Freshman of the Year in 2023.

Early life and career
Bona was born Ikechukwu Stanley Okoro in Lagos, Nigeria, as the youngest of five children. He grew up playing football as a midfielder but switched to basketball due to his height. He often played basketball with makeshift hoops in the fields, sometimes without a ball. Okoro was playing for about one year when a video of him drew the attention of Turkish coach Türkay Çakıroğlu, who then contacted Istanbul Basket coach Nevzat Özdemir. At age 13, he moved to Turkey, leaving behind the rest of his family, and began his career with Istanbul Basket. In February 2019, Bona moved to Pınar Karşıyaka and continued competing at the youth level.

On October 30, 2019, Bona made his professional debut for Pınar Karşıyaka, playing one minute in a 77–57 win over Donar in the FIBA Europe Cup. On November 16, he debuted in the Basketball Super League (BSL), scoring two points in an 84–55 victory over Galatasaray.

High school career
On September 18, 2020, it was announced that Bona would continue his career at Prolific Prep in Napa, California.

Recruiting
Bona is a consensus five-star recruit and one of the top players in the 2022 class, according to major recruiting services. On November 1, 2021, he committed to playing college basketball for UCLA over an offer from Kentucky.

College career
As a freshman at the University of California, Los Angeles, in 2022–23, Bona improved after about a month of foul trouble and dropped passes. On January 2, 2023, he was named the Pac-12's freshman of the week after scoring the go-ahead basket in a comeback win over Washington State, followed by a career-high 18 points and three blocks in a victory against Washington. He won consecutive freshman of the week honors after grabbing a career-high 10 rebounds along with two blocked shots to help UCLA beat USC. Bona was named to the Pac-12 All-Defensive and Pac-12 All-Freshman teams and was voted the Pac-12 Freshman of the Year. He also received honorable mention for the All-Pac-12 team. In the 2023 Pac-12 tournament, Bona injured his left shoulder in the semifinals against Oregon. He missed the finals against Arizona, who defeated UCLA for the title. The Bruins received a No. 2 seed in the 2023 NCAA tournament. Bona was cleared to return in their opener, but he did not play in the 86–53 blowout over No. 15-seed UNC Asheville. He returned in the following game against Northwestern, making a key block in the final minutes to help secure a 68–63 win over the seventh-seeded Wildcats.

National team career
At the 2019 FIBA U16 European Championship in Udine, Bona averaged 14.1 points, 10.3 rebounds and four blocks per game, leading Turkey to fifth place. He ranked second at the tournament in rebounds and blocks and was named to the All-Star Five.

Personal life
In April 2018, Okoro became a Turkish citizen and officially changed his name to Adem Bona. He named himself after Adam.

References

External links
UCLA Bruins bio

2003 births
Living people
Karşıyaka basketball players
UCLA Bruins men's basketball players
McDonald's High School All-Americans
Naturalized citizens of Turkey
Nigerian men's basketball players
Power forwards (basketball)
Sportspeople from Lagos
Turkish men's basketball players
Turkish people of Nigerian descent